Walter Devereux may refer to:

Walter Devereux (1173–c. 1197), Anglo-Norman nobleman
Walter Devereux of Bodenham and Bromwich, (c. 1221–1292), Anglo-Norman knight and sheriff of Herefordshire
Walter Devereux (c. 1266–1305), member of a prominent knightly family in Herefordshire
Walter Devereux (c. 1339–c. 1383), Member of Parliament, sheriff, and Justice of the Peace for Hereford
Walter Devereux (c. 1361–1402), MP for Herefordshire 1401
Walter Devereux (1387–1419), knight of Herefordshire
Walter Devereux (1411–1459), Lord Chancellor of Ireland 1449–c. 1451
Walter Devereux, 8th Baron Ferrers of Chartley (c. 1431–1485), son of the above, Yorkist politician and military officer during the Wars of the Roses
Walter Devereux (MP for Cardiganshire), MP for Cardiganshire, 1547
Walter Devereux, 1st Viscount Hereford (1488–1558), grandson of the above, Custos Rotulorum of Cardiganshire from 1543 to 1558
Walter Devereux, 1st Earl of Essex (1541–1576), grandson of the above, Earl Marshal of Ireland in 1576
 Walter Devereux (assassin) (died 1640), Irish assassin of Albrecht von Wallenstein
Walter Devereux (died 1641), MP for Pembroke, Tamworth and Lichfield
Walter Devereux, 5th Viscount Hereford (1578–1658), grandson of the first Viscount, MP for Stafford and Worcestershire
Walter Devereux (died 1683), MP for Orford

See also
Walter Deveraux, a fictional character in Hollyoaks